DiskSpd is a free and open-source command-line tool for storage benchmarking on Microsoft Windows that generates a variety of requests against computer files, partitions or storage devices and presents collected statistics as text in the command-line interface or as an XML file.

Overview
The command supports physical and virtual storage including hard disk drive (HDD), solid state devices (SSD), and solid state hybrid drives (SSHD). It provides control over the testing methods, duration, threads, queues, IO and processor affinity, and reporting.

DiskSpd works on desktop versions of Windows 7, Windows 8, Windows 8.1, Windows 10, as well as Windows Server 2012, Windows 2012 R2, and Windows Server 2016.

It is licensed under MIT License and the source code is available on GitHub.

Example
Benchmark two drives (C: and E:) using a 100 MB test file, and run the test for a duration of 60 seconds (the default is 10).

C:\>diskspd -c100M -d60 c: e:

See also

 Iometer
 ProcDump

References

External links
 TechNet DiskSpd: A Robust Storage Performance Tool
 
 Using Microsoft DiskSpd to Test Your Storage Subsystem

Command-line software
Benchmarks (computing)
Free software programmed in C++
Microsoft free software
Software using the MIT license
Storage software
Utilities for Windows